Manor Ground was a cricket ground at Bexhill-on-Sea, Sussex, England.  The first recorded match on the ground was in 1894, when Viscount Cantelupe's XI played the touring South Africans in a non first-class match.  The only first-class match held at the ground came in 1896 when Earl de la Warr's XI played the touring Australians. In 1965 when Sussex played the International Cavaliers. The ground is today a part of the sports field of St Richard's Catholic College.

References

External links
Manor Ground on CricketArchive
Manor Ground on Cricinfo

Defunct cricket grounds in England
Buildings and structures in East Sussex
Cricket in East Sussex
Sports venues in East Sussex
Defunct sports venues in East Sussex
Sports venues completed in 1894
Bexhill-on-Sea